Holloway Road is a station on the London Underground. It is on the Piccadilly line between Caledonian Road and Arsenal stations, and in Travelcard Zone 2. The station opened on 15 December 1906.

The station was constructed by the Great Northern, Piccadilly and Brompton Railway and was built with two lift shafts, but only one was ever used for lifts. The second shaft was the site of an experimental spiral escalator which was built by the American inventor of escalators, Jesse W. Reno. The experiment was not successful and was never used by the public. In the 1990s, remains of the escalator equipment were excavated from the base of the lift shaft and stored at the London Transport Museum Depot in Acton. From the platforms, a second exit no longer in use is visible and leads to the back of the used lift shaft.

The station is adjacent to the site of the former Holloway and Caledonian Road railway station.

The station is close to the Emirates Stadium, the home of Arsenal football club. As part of the planning permission £5m was due to be spent expanding the current station to cope with increased passenger numbers on match days.  However subsequent studies showed that to ensure the station could cope with the numbers the lifts would have to be replaced with escalators which would cost £60m. As a result, the redevelopment plans were put on hold and now at match times the station is exit only, and before a match eastbound trains do not call.

Design
The architect of the station was Leslie Green who built it for the Great Northern, Piccadilly and Brompton Railway (Now part of London Transport) in the Modern Style (British Art Nouveau style). The building is listed by English Heritage as Grade II.

Refurbishment, 2007–2008
Refurbishment works completed in 2008 included the installation of a new public address system, replacement of aging customer information screens, and other aesthetic changes to improve the look, feel and security of the station. This includes improved lighting and a dramatic increase in the number of CCTV cameras.

Connections
London Buses routes 21, 43, 153, 263, 393 and night routes N41 and N271 serve the station.

References

Gallery

External links

 
 
 
 
 
 
 

Piccadilly line stations
London Underground Night Tube stations
Former Great Northern, Piccadilly and Brompton Railway stations
Tube stations in the London Borough of Islington
Railway stations in Great Britain opened in 1906
Grade II listed buildings in the London Borough of Islington
Leslie Green railway stations